RESQSHIP is a German charity based in Hamburg, with further branches in Freiburg, Mainz and Augsburg, founded in 2017.

The Non-Governmental Organisation has been operating the 14m sailing yacht Josefa primarily to observe and monitor the situation off the Libyan coast. However, on occasion the Josefa has been in such a position as to need to carry out rescues herself. Typically, as she is a relatively small yacht, in such cases onward transfer to a larger vessel is arranged as soon as possible. Josefa is named for a woman rescued from the sea by the NGO Proactiva Open Arms.

According to RESQSHIP, during 2019, the Josefa carried out nine rescue missions. 

In May 2021 Josefa was replaced with a newer and larger (18m) ketch, the Nadir. Resqship resumed operations in June 2021 with the Nadir.

External links 
RESQSHIP Official website

References 

Sea rescue organizations
European migrant crisis
Immigrant rights activism
Humanitarian aid organizations in Europe
Refugee aid organizations in Europe